Semponius "Semp" Russ (April 16, 1878 – March 12, 1978) was an American tennis player. He competed in the men's singles and doubles events at the 1904 Summer Olympics. He was also the quarterback of the Texas Longhorns from 1898 to 1900; chosen for an all-time Texas team by R. W. Franklin.

References

External links
 

1878 births
1978 deaths
American male tennis players
Olympic tennis players of the United States
Tennis players at the 1904 Summer Olympics
American football quarterbacks
Texas Longhorns football players
Players of American football from Louisiana
Tennis people from Louisiana
19th-century players of American football